A Painter Passing Through is the eighteenth studio album by Canadian singer Gordon Lightfoot, released in 1998 on Reprise Records. It was his first album of original music in five years after Waiting for You, which had been his first since 1986's East of Midnight. Well-known record producer Daniel Lanois makes a guest appearance on the album. A Painter Passing Through is a live studio album.

The song "Drifters" was performed by Ron Sexsmith on the album, Beautiful: A Tribute to Gordon Lightfoot, in 2003.

Track listing
All compositions by Gordon Lightfoot, except where noted.

"Drifters" - 3:27
"My Little Love" - 4:08
"Ringneck Loon" - 4:14
"I Used to Be a Country Singer" (Steve McEown) - 3:16
"Boathouse" - 4:13
"Much to My Surprise" - 3:42
"A Painter Passing Through" - 3:55
"On Yonge Street" - 4:27
"Red Velvet" (Ian Tyson) - 2:37
"Uncle Toad Said" - 3:29

Personnel
Gordon Lightfoot – vocals, six, twelve and high-string guitars
Terry Clements – acoustic and electric guitars
Daniel Lanois – electric and mando-guitars
Bill Dillon – electric guitar, guitorgan
Wendell Ferguson – electric guitar
John Lewis – electric guitar
Doug Johnson – steel guitar, dobro, pedal steel guitar
Pee Wee Charles – pedal and steel guitar
Mike Heffernan – synthesizer, keyboards
Rick Haynes – bass guitar
Barry Keane – drums, percussion
Lisa Logan, Lisa Winn, Bob Doidge – backing vocals
Willie P. Bennett – harmonica

External links
Florian Bodenseher's fansite on Gordon Lightfoot
Album lyrics and chords

Gordon Lightfoot albums
1998 albums
Reprise Records albums